Harold Rudman (4 November 1924 – 4 October 2013) was an English professional footballer who played as a full back.

References

1924 births
2013 deaths
People from the Borough of Rossendale
English footballers
Association football fullbacks
Burnley F.C. players
Rochdale A.F.C. players
English Football League players